Duke of Abrantes (unrelated to the Spanish and French titles) is a title of Portuguese nobility. It is the only one that was officially recognised by the Kingdom of Portugal. It was created by decree of King Joseph I of Portugal, on 9 December 1753, for Ana Maria Catarina Henriqueta de Lorena, 3rd Marchioness of Abrantes and 9th Countess of Penaguião.

The King advanced Dona Ana Maria de Lorena, 3rd Marchioness of Abrantes, to the rank of duchess (vitalício) upon her appointment as The Queen's Maid of Honour (Camareira-Môr), the highest court position for ladies. The title was subsequently revived for the same reason in favour of her daughter Maria Margarida, considered to be the "2nd Duchess".

List of the Duchesses of Abrantes 
Ana Maria Catarina Henriqueta de Lorena, Duchess of Abrantes vitalício (1691–1761), also 3rd Marchioness of Abrantes;
Maria Margarida de Lorena, Duchess of Abrantes vitalício (1713–1780), also 4th Marchioness of Abrantes (daughter of Duquesa Ana Maria).

Subsidiary titles held by the Duchesses of Abrantes 
Countess of Penaguião, created in 1583 by King Philip I of Portugal;
Marchioness of Abrantes, created in 1718 by King John V of Portugal.

See also
Count of Abrantes
Genealogical tree of the House of Abrantes
House of Abrantes
House of Lancaster
List of Portuguese Dukedoms
Marquis of Abrantes

Bibliography
Nobreza de Portugal e do Brasil, Vol. II, pp. 203–208, Lisbon, Zairol, 1989.

References

Dukedoms of Portugal